20th Lux Style Awards

Official Poster

Date: 
9 October 2021
 
Host:

Director:

Venue: 
Expo Center, Karachi, Sindh

Best TV Play:
Ehd-e-Wafa

←19th Lux Style Awards  21st→

The 20th Lux Style Awards presented by Lux to honor the best in fashion, music, films and Pakistani television of 2020, took place on 9 October 2021 in Karachi.

The television broadcast was aired on Geo Entertainment on 21 November 2021.
The ceremony was hosted by Dino Ali and Ayesha Omar. Pyar Ke Sadqay remained the most awarded TV series by winning 4 awards.

 19th Lux Style Awards

Winners and nominees 
The nominations were announced on 26 August 2021.

Television

Controversy 
One of the Pakistan's biggest TV channels ARY Digital refused to submit any dramas to the LSAs. Many of the acclaimed dramas like Dushman e Jaan and Ghisi Piti Mohabbat did not get nominated due to ARY Digital's move.
Plays from only two channels (Hum TV and Geo TV) ended up getting nominated.

Music

Special

Lux Change Maker Awards 
 Haseena Moin

Chairperson's Lifetime Achievement Award 
 Farida Khanam

References 

Lux Style Awards ceremonies
2020 in Pakistani television
2021 in Pakistani television